Night and Day is a novel by Virginia Woolf first published on 20 October 1919. Set in Edwardian London, Night and Day contrasts the daily lives and romantic attachments of two acquaintances, Katharine Hilbery and Mary Datchet. The novel examines the relationships between love, marriage, happiness, and success.

The novel has four major characters: Katharine Hilbery, Mary Datchet, Ralph Denham, and William Rodney. Night and Day deals with questions concerning women's suffrage, and asks whether love and marriage can coexist and whether marriage is necessary for happiness. Motifs throughout the book include the stars and sky, the River Thames, and walks. Woolf makes many references to the works of William Shakespeare, especially As You Like It.

Characters

Katharine Hilbery
Katharine Hilbery is the granddaughter of a distinguished poet and belongs to a privileged class. Though her family is literary, Katharine secretly prefers mathematics and astronomy. Early in the novel, Katharine becomes engaged to William Rodney. After a time they end their engagement so that Rodney can explore a relationship with Katharine's cousin, Cassandra Otway. Eventually, Katharine agrees to marry Ralph Denham.

Katharine's mother, Mrs. Margaret Hilbery, plays a significant role in Katharine's life, while Katharine's father, Mr. Trevor Hilbery, is only seen on a few occasions. Mr. Hilbery registers his disapproval of the actions of Katharine and her friends when he learns that she and William have broken their engagement so that William could become engaged to Cassandra. Although Mary and Katharine are the primary women characters, Katharine does not often interact with Mary. Katharine is a very solitary person, and she struggles to reconcile her need for personal freedom with her notions of love.

Ralph Denham
Ralph Denham is a lawyer who occasionally writes articles for a journal edited by Trevor Hilbery, Katharine's father. Unlike a few other characters in the novel, he has to work to make a living and take care of his family: his mother, a widow, and several siblings. He makes his first appearance in the novel at the Hilberys' tea party. He leaves the party saying "She'll do...Yes, Katharine Hilbery'll do...I'll take Katharine Hilbery" (p 24), and from this point Ralph is in constant pursuit of Katharine. He repeatedly follows Katharine through the streets of London and often passes her house, hoping to see her inside.

Ralph's relationship with William Rodney is relatively formal, while Ralph's relationship with Mary is more friendly. At one point in the story Ralph realises Mary's love for him and he proposes to her; however, Mary has already realised he loves Katharine and rejects his proposal.

Mary Datchet
Mary Datchet, the daughter of a country vicar, works in the office of an organisation that campaigns for the enactment of women's suffrage. Though she could live comfortably without working, Mary chooses to work. Mary can be considered an example of the ideal Virginia Woolf detailed in A Room of One's Own, Professions for Women (one essay in The Death of the Moth and Other Essays, Harcourt, 1942, pp. 236–8), and other feminist essays.

Mary's romantic life is short-lived and unsuccessful. She falls wildly in love with Ralph Denham, and wishes to move to the country with him. However, when he finally proposes to her, she rejects him, deeming him insincere. Mary also serves as an emotional outlet for the other characters, especially Ralph and Katharine. Whenever Ralph, Katharine, or the other characters need to tell someone about their love or anguish, they always go for tea at Mary's. She remains unwed at the novel's end.

William Rodney
William is a frustrated poet and dramatist, who often subjects others to his mediocre works. He is Katharine's first romantic interest, but he is largely attracted by her grandfather's status as one of the greatest English poets. William often tries to impress Katharine without realising his limitations. After Katharine determines not to marry him, William becomes interested in Katharine's cousin, Cassandra Otway. While Katharine represents the new generation's ideas about marriage, Cassandra—in William's mind, at least—represents conventional Victorian ideas about marriage in which the wife serves her husband. At the end of the novel, William and Cassandra are engaged.

Other characters
The story, though it centres on Katharine, Ralph, Mary, and William, is dotted with minor characters who appear for the most part only at the various tea parties. They include:

Cassandra Otway, Katharine's cousin who becomes engaged to William
Henry, Katharine's cousin and Cassandra's brother
Trevor and Margaret Hilbery, Katharine's parents
Mr. Datchet
Mrs. Cosham
Aunt Celia
Cyril, Katharine's cousin who has two children with the woman he is living with, but not married to; he represents the new age of modern ideas about marriage and relationships
Mr. Clacton and Mrs. Seal, Mary's co-workers in the office of a pro-suffrage organisation
Mr. Basnett
Joan, Ralph's sister
Harry Sandys, an old college friend of Ralph
Mrs. Denham, Ralph's mother

External links
 
 

1919 British novels
Novels by Virginia Woolf
Novels set in London
Gerald Duckworth and Company books